Ellenborough is a suburb of the town of Maryport, Cumbria, England, historically within Cumberland.

It takes its name from the nearby River Ellen. The population of the electoral ward taken at the 2011 census was 3,810. 


Governance
Ellenborough is in the parliamentary constituency of Workington, Mark Jenkinson is the Member of parliament.

For Local Government purposes it is in the Maryport North Ward of Allerdale Borough Council and the Maryport North Ward of Cumbria County Council.

Ellenborough does not have its own parish council, instead it is governed by Maryport Town Council.

Transport 
For transport there is the A594 going through the settlement and the A596 nearby; Maryport railway station is nearby.

Nearby settlements 
Other suburbs of Maryport include Ewanrigg, Netherton and Glasson.

References

External links
Cumbria County History Trust: Ellenborough and Ewanrigg (nb: provisional research only – see Talk page)
 https://web.archive.org/web/20100604015535/http://www.aboutbritain.com/towns/ellenborough.asp
 https://web.archive.org/web/20100530112034/http://www.visitcumbria.com/churches/maryport-ellenborough.htm

Maryport